Maruša Ferk Saioni (born 27 September 1988) is a Slovenian alpine skier.

She is a member of DTV Partizan Blejska Dobrava. In 2020, she married Christophe Saioni, a former alpine skier and current skiing coach from France. 

Her best result in the World Cup is a 3rd place in slalom in Garmisch Partenkirchen in 2009.

She was a member of the Slovenian Women's Alpine Skiing team at the 2010 Winter Olympics, competing in the Women's Downhill, Women's Super, Women's Slalom and Women's Combined events. At 21 years 143 days she was the youngest member of the Slovenian team at the Games

World Cup results

Season standings

Standings through 13 February 2021

Race podiums
 1 podium – (1 SL)

World Championship results

Olympic results

References

External links 

 
 

1988 births
Living people
People from the Municipality of Jesenice
Slovenian female alpine skiers
Alpine skiers at the 2010 Winter Olympics
Alpine skiers at the 2014 Winter Olympics
Alpine skiers at the 2018 Winter Olympics
Alpine skiers at the 2022 Winter Olympics
Olympic alpine skiers of Slovenia